Perilla frutescens, commonly called deulkkae, perilla or Korean perilla, is a species of Perilla in the mint family Lamiaceae. It is an annual plant native to Southeast Asia and Indian highlands, and is traditionally grown in the Korean peninsula, southern China, Japan and India as a crop.

An edible plant, perilla is grown in gardens and attracts butterflies. It is aromatic with a strong mint-like smell. A variety of this plant, P. frutescens var. crispa known as "shiso", is widely grown in Japan. In the United States, perilla is a weed pest, toxic to cattle after ingestion.

Names 
Along with other plants in the genus Perilla, the plant is commonly called "perilla". It is also referred to as Korean perilla, due to its extensive cultivation in Korea and use in Korean cuisine.

In the United States, where the plant has become a weed, the plant is known by many names, such as perilla mint, beefsteak plant, purple perilla, Chinese basil, wild basil, blueweed, Joseph's coat, wild coleus and rattlesnake weed.

Infraspecific taxa 
Perilla frutescens has three known varieties.
 P. frutescens (var. frutescens) – called Korean perilla or deulkkae.
 P. frutescens var. crispa – also called shiso or tía tô.
 P. frutescens var. hirtella – also called lemon perilla.

Description 

The leaves are green with occasional touches of purple on the underside.

The flowers bloom on racemes at the end of branches and the main stalk in late summer. Two of the four stamens are long.

The fruit is a schizocarp,  in diameter, and with reticulate pattern on the outside. Perilla seeds contain about 38-45% lipid.

Cultivation 
The plant was introduced into Korea before the Unified Silla era, when it started to be widely cultivated.

In its natural state, the yield of perilla leaves and seeds is not high. Leaves can be harvested from the stem cut off in the summer, as well as from the new stalk and its branches, throughout summer and autumn. The seeds are harvested in autumn when the fruits are ripe. To collect perilla seeds, the whole plant is harvested, and the seeds are beat out of the plant, before being spread for sun drying.

Traditional medicine, phytochemicals, and toxicity 
Various perilla varieties are used for traditional medicine in Southeast Asia.

Characteristic aroma-active phytochemicals in perilla leaves include hydrocarbons, alcohols, aldehydes, furans, and ketones, particularly perilla ketone, egoma ketone, and isoegoma ketone. Other phytochemicals are alkaloids, terpenoids, quinines, phenylpropanoids, polyphenolics, flavonoids, coumarins, anthocyanins, carotenoids, neolignans, fatty acids, tocopherols, and sitosterols.

Other compounds include perillaldehyde, limonene, linalool, beta-caryophyllene, menthol, and alpha-pinene. The crispa variety is differentiated by leaf and stem colors, which vary from green to red to purple, indicating the presence of anthocyanins.

Although perilla is widely cultivated as an edible plant for humans, it is toxic to cattle and other ruminants, as well as horses. In grazing cattle, plant ketones cause acute respiratory distress syndrome, also called "panting disease".

Adverse effects
Contact dermatitis may occur in people handling the leaves or oil. Consumption of large amounts of seeds has resulted in anaphylaxis.

Nutritional value 

Perilla seeds are rich in dietary fiber and dietary minerals such as calcium, iron, niacin, protein, and thiamine. Perilla leaves are also rich in vitamins A, C and riboflavin.

Use

Culinary

East Asia

China 
In Manchu cuisine, perilla leaves are used to make efen, ("steamed bun"). The perilla buns are made with glutinous sorghum or glutinous rice flour dough filled with red bean paste and wrapped with perilla leaves. The dish is related to Food Exhaustion Day, a traditional Manchu holiday celebrated on every 26th day of the 8th month of the lunisolar calendar.

Japan 
In Japan, the plant is used far less compared to shiso (Perilla frutescens var. crispa). In the Tōhoku regions of northeastern Japan, it is known as jūnen ("ten years"), because it was believed to add ten years to a person's lifespan. A local preparation in Fukushima Prefecture, called shingorō, consists of half-pounded non-glutinous rice patties, which are skewered, smeared with miso, blended with roasted and ground jūnen seeds, and roasted over charcoal.

Oil pressed from the seeds was historically used to in lamps. The warlord Saitō Dōsan (1494–1556) was said to have been originally a seller of egoma seed oil.

Korea 
In Korean cuisine, kkaennip or perilla leaves are widely used as a herb and a vegetable. Kkaennip can be used fresh as a ssam vegetable, fresh or blanched as a namul vegetable, or pickled in soy sauce or soybean paste to make jangajji (pickle) or kimchi.

Deulkkae, the perilla seeds, are either toasted and ground into powder called deulkkae-garu or toasted and pressed to make perilla oil. Toasted deulkkae powder is used as a spice and a condiment for guk (soup), namul (seasoned vegetable dishes), guksu (noodle dishes), kimchi, and eomuk (fishcake). It is also used as gomul (coating or topping) for desserts: Yeot and several tteok (rice cake) varieties can be coated with toasted perilla powder. Perilla oil made from toasted perilla seeds is used as a cooking oil and as a condiment.

In Korean-style western food, perilla leaves are sometimes used to substitute basil, and the seed powder and oil is used in salad dressings as well as in dipping sauces. A Michelin-starred restaurant in Seoul serves nutty vanilla ice cream whose secret ingredient is perilla oil.

South Asia

India 
In India, perilla seeds are roasted and ground with salt, chilis, and tomatoes to make a savoury side dish or chutney. In Kumaon, the seeds of bhangira (cultivated perilla) are eaten raw, the seed oil is used for cooking purposes, and the oil cake is consumed raw or fed to cattle. The roasted seeds are also ground to prepare a spicy chutney. The seeds and leaves of Perilla are also used for flavoring curries in north east India. Manipuri cuisine uses the ground roasted seed in a salad locally known as singju. Known as nei lieh by the Khasis its seeds are used in salads and meat dishes. The Assamese, Bodos and Nagas are also well aware of its uses.

Nepal 
In Nepal, perilla is called silam (सिलाम). Perilla seeds are roasted and ground with salt, chilis, and tomatoes to make a savoury dip/side dish or chutney.

Seed oil

Having a distinctive nutty aroma and taste, the oil pressed from the toasted perilla seeds is used as a flavor enhancer, condiment, and a cooking oil in Korean cuisine. The press cake remaining after pressing perilla oil can be used as natural fertilizer or animal feed.

See also 

 Shiso (Perilla frutescens var. crispa)
 Sesame (Sesamum indicum)

References 

Edible nuts and seeds
Herbs
Korean cuisine
Korean condiments
Korean vegetables
Lamiaceae